The Richmond Hill Liberal is a Canadian newspaper based in Richmond Hill, Ontario and servicing Richmond Hill and surrounding communities since 1878 as a weekly local newspaper. It usually gives full coverage to all local council meetings.

The paper was founded in 1878 after the Conservative York Herald (the town's only paper) attacked the more progressive Richmond Hill council.

Thomas F. McMahon purchased the newspaper in 1884, and was the editor until his death in 1925. James H. Ormiston was a later editor.

References

Weekly newspapers published in Ontario
1878 establishments in Canada